Colin Mills may refer to:

 Colin Mills (educationalist) (born 1951), British educationalist
 Colin Mills (sociologist), British sociologist